Alex Král (born 19 May 1998) is a Czech professional footballer who plays as a defensive midfielder for Bundesliga club Schalke 04, on a short-term agreement whilst his contract is suspended with Russian Premier League side Spartak Moscow. He also plays for the Czech Republic national team.

Early life

Born in Slovakia, Král’s family moved to Štýřice, Brno in the Czech Republic, when he was a child. He began playing football at SK Moravská Slavia Brno aged six, before joining Zbrojovka Brno aged nine. At 14, he was scouted and recruited by Slavia Prague moving to Prague to continue his development.

Club career

Slavia Prague
In January 2019, he signed a four-year contract with Slavia Prague.

Spartak Moscow
On 1 September 2019, he signed a five-year contract with the Russian Premier League club Spartak Moscow. He has since played for the club for several seasons, which included participation in the UEFA Champions League.

Loan to West Ham United
On 31 August 2021, Král joined English side West Ham United on a season-long loan with an option to make the deal permanent.
He made his debut on 22 September in a 1–0 win against Manchester United in the EFL Cup at Old Trafford. His league debut followed when he came on as a substitute in a 4–1 win at Watford on 28 December 2021. Král made one appearance in the Premier League, three times in the Europa League and once in the FA Cup and the EFL Cup before his loan ended.

Contract suspension and Schalke 04
On 1 July 2022, Spartak announced that Král suspended his contract with Spartak Moscow for the 2022–23 season using FIFA's special regulations related to the international response and other fallout from the Russian invasion of Ukraine. On 14 July 2022, Schalke 04 announced the signing of Král to a one-year contract, and under FIFA regulations he remains a Spartak player temporarily playing for Schalke 04.

International career
Král made his debut for the Czech Republic national team on 26 March 2019 in a friendly against Brazil, as a 69th-minute substitute for David Pavelka.

Career statistics

Club

International

Scores and results list the Czech Republic's goal tally first.

Honours
Slavia Prague
 Czech First League: 2018–19
 Czech Cup: 2018–19

Individual
 UEFA European Under-19 Championship Team of the Tournament: 2017

References

External links

 
 
 
 Alex Král at West Ham United F.C. (archived)
 
 
 

Living people
1998 births
Czech footballers
Association football midfielders
FK Teplice players
SK Slavia Prague players
FC Spartak Moscow players
West Ham United F.C. players
FC Schalke 04 players
Czech First League players
Russian Premier League players
Premier League players
Bundesliga players
Czech Republic youth international footballers
Czech Republic under-21 international footballers
Czech Republic international footballers
UEFA Euro 2020 players
Czech expatriate footballers
Czech expatriate sportspeople in Russia
Expatriate footballers in Russia
Czech expatriate sportspeople in England
Expatriate footballers in England
Sportspeople from Košice
Slovak expatriate sportspeople in the Czech Republic
Footballers from Brno
Czech expatriate sportspeople in Germany
Expatriate footballers in Germany